Plantegumia is a genus of moths of the family Crambidae. The three described species are distributed in Central and South America.

The genus was formerly treated in Spilomelinae, but is now placed in Glaphyriinae.

Species
Plantegumia flavaginalis (Hedemann, 1894)
Plantegumia leptidalis (Hampson, 1913)
Plantegumia venezuelensis Amsel, 1956

References

Natural History Museum Lepidoptera genus database

Glaphyriinae
Crambidae genera
Taxa named by Hans Georg Amsel